is a Japanese former Nippon Professional Baseball pitcher.  In February 2023, he was hired by his former school of Tottori Jōhoku High School, to train its baseball team.

References 

1959 births
Living people
Baseball people from Tottori Prefecture 
Japanese baseball players
Nippon Professional Baseball pitchers
Hiroshima Toyo Carp players
Yomiuri Giants players
Japanese baseball coaches
Nippon Professional Baseball coaches